The 2019–20 Manhattan Jaspers basketball team represented Manhattan College in the 2019–20 NCAA Division I men's basketball season. The Jaspers, led by 9th-year head coach Steve Masiello, played their home games at Draddy Gymnasium in Riverdale, New York as members of the Metro Atlantic Athletic Conference. They finished the season 13–18 overall, 8–12 in MAAC play to finish in a tie for eighth place. As the #9 seed in the MAAC tournament, they defeated #8 seed Fairfield 61–43 in the first round before losing to #1 seed Siena 49–63 in the quarterfinals.

Previous season
The Jaspers finished the 2018–19 season 11–21 overall, 8–10 in MAAC play to finish in seventh place. As the No. 7 seed in the 2019 MAAC tournament, they defeated No. 10 seed Fairfield in the first round 57–53, before falling to No. 2 seed Canisius 65–69OT in the quarterfinals.

Roster

Schedule and results

|-
!colspan=12 style=| Non-conference regular season

|-
!colspan=9 style=| MAAC regular season

|-
!colspan=12 style=| MAAC tournament
|-

|-

Source

References

Manhattan Jaspers basketball seasons
Manhattan Jaspers
Manhattan Jaspers basketball
Manhattan Jaspers basketball